Leptodactylus albilabris is a species of frog in the family Leptodactylidae.

Common names
Its local name is ranita de labio blanco or sapito de labio blanco ("white-lipped froglet") and English name either Gunther's white-lipped frog or Hispaniolan ditch frog.

Distribution
It is found in the Dominican Republic on Hispaniola, Puerto Rico, the British Virgin Islands, and the U.S. Virgin Islands.

Description
The white-lipped frog is a terrestrial (living on the ground) smooth-bodied frog (not warty like a toad) which passes through a tadpole stage. L. albilabris can be recognized by its white upper lip (hence the name albilabris), webless fingers and toes, black streak between the eyes and the tip of the snout and between eye and shoulder. Individuals have a grayish brown background color with dorsal lines and bands of various shades of brown, cream, and reddish brown. It is white ventrally, and some males have many dark spots on the throat. Its voice is a "pink-pink-pink" sound usually heard from a muddy area.

Habits
The frog's diet includes insects, millipedes and land snails. It lays terrestrial eggs, but they are laid in a foam nest on the ground, usually under a rock or log. Eggs develop into tadpoles, which are washed away by the first rains and finish their development in temporary pools, or bodies of water with low or no water movement.

Habitat
This frog can usually be found in muddy areas near streams, marshes and ditches.

References

Rivero, Juan A., 1978; The Amphibians and Reptiles of Puerto Rico, Editorial de la Universidad de Puerto Rico

albilabris
Amphibians of the Dominican Republic
Amphibians of the United States Virgin Islands
Amphibians of Puerto Rico
Taxonomy articles created by Polbot
Amphibians described in 1859
Taxa named by Albert Günther